Jacco Eltingh and Paul Haarhuis defeated Mark Knowles and Daniel Nestor in the final, 6–4, 6–2, 7–5 to win the doubles tennis title at the 1998 ATP Tour World Championships.

Rick Leach and Jonathan Stark were the defending champions, but did not compete together in 1998. Stark failed to qualify with another partner; Leach partnered Ellis Ferreira, but was eliminated in the round-robin stage.

Seeds

Draw

Finals

Green group
Standings are determined by: 1. number of wins; 2. number of matches; 3. in two-players-ties, head-to-head records; 4. in three-players-ties, percentage of sets won, or of games won; 5. steering-committee decision.

Gold group
Standings are determined by: 1. number of wins; 2. number of matches; 3. in two-players-ties, head-to-head records; 4. in three-players-ties, percentage of sets won, or of games won; 5. steering-committee decision.

External links
Finals Draw
Round robin Draw (Green Group)
Round robin Draw (Gold Group)

Doubles

1998 in American sports
Tennis tournaments in the United States
Sports in Hartford, Connecticut
Sports competitions in Hartford, Connecticut